Jordi Rubio Gómez (born 1 November 1987) is an Andorran international footballer who plays as a defender.

Career
Rubio began his senior career at FC Andorra in 2006, before moving to Santa Coloma in 2008.

He made his international debut for Andorra in 2006.

References

External links

1987 births
Living people
Andorran footballers
Andorra international footballers
FC Andorra players
UE Santa Coloma players
Association football defenders